Montford George Southall (17 July 1907–2 May 1993) was a British track cyclist. He won a bronze medal at the 1928 Summer Olympics in the team pursuit event.

He was born in the Wandsworth district of London and died in Waveney, Suffolk.

References

1907 births
1993 deaths
English male cyclists
Olympic bronze medallists for Great Britain
Olympic cyclists of Great Britain
Cyclists at the 1928 Summer Olympics
Olympic medalists in cycling
Cyclists from Greater London
Medalists at the 1928 Summer Olympics